A junk drawer or junkdrawer is a drawer used for storing small, miscellaneous, occasionally useful objects of little to no (or unclear) monetary value, and possibly significant sentimental value. Junk drawers are often located in residential kitchens, but they may exist anywhere with cabinetry or furniture used for storage, including home offices or workshops, and even commercial workplaces and businesses. The phrase "junk drawer" appears to be an Americanism dating to the early 1900s.

Typical contents
As their name suggests, junk drawers often contain various types of unrelated and unorganized objects, such as small commonly-used tools like screwdrivers, pliers, tape measures, scissors, glue, sandpaper, birthday candles, and pens; small, loose, hard-to-store items like thumbtacks, binder clips, toothpicks, rubber bands, batteries, and safety pins; stationery and crafting materials; "leftover" objects of uncertain or forgotten origin like "orphaned" board game pieces, bottle caps, and old electronics chargers; coins and receipts; medication and bandages; or even objects with sentimental value such as souvenirs and love letters.

Etymology and history
The phrase and concept of a junk drawer started to appear in American literature and trade journals in the early 1900s and 1910s.

The concept of a junk drawer seems to slightly predate the phrase. In a short story contained in a 1901 University of Michigan alumni publication, the author writes about a séance where a table lifts in the air and then "land[s] on the floor legs up, with a startling crash, aided greatly by the junk in the drawer." A letter to the editor in the October 9, 1902, edition of the trade journal American Machinist proposes a design for a drafter's desk which includes a "little closet...which provided an excellent place to store up the variety of junk that comes to hand from time to time" in the space behind shallow drawers.

In popular culture
American novelist John R. Powers published a book titled The Junk Drawer, Corner Store, Front Porch Blues in 1992.

References

Kitchen
Furniture
Cabinets (furniture)
Containers
Social phenomena